is a Japanese football player. He currently plays for ReinMeer Aomori.

Career
On 23 December 2015, Funayama transferred to J2 club, JEF United Chiba for 2016 season. On 4 December 2021, he announced the expiration of his contract with Chiba, although he was regretted by many supporters.

On 30 December 2021, Funayama joined to J3 relegated club, SC Sagamihara for 2022 season. On 28 November 2022, he left from the club in 2022 after sagamihara expiration contract.

On 27 January 2023, Funayama announcement officially transfer to JFL club, ReinMeer Aomori for ahead of 2023 season.

Personal life
His elder brother Yuji is also a Japanese footballer until he retirement in 2016.

Career statistics

Club
Updated to the start of 2023 season.

References

External links
Profile at JEF United Chiba

1987 births
Living people
People from Narita, Chiba
Ryutsu Keizai University alumni
Association football people from Chiba Prefecture
Japanese footballers
J1 League players
J2 League players
J3 League players
Japan Football League players
Tochigi SC players
Matsumoto Yamaga FC players
Kawasaki Frontale players
JEF United Chiba players
SC Sagamihara players
ReinMeer Aomori players
Association football forwards